Monastic houses in England include abbeys, priories and friaries, among other monastic religious houses.

The sites are listed by modern (post-1974) county.

Overview

The list is presented in alphabetical order ceremonial county. Foundations are listed alphabetically within each county.

Communities/provenance: shows the status and communities existing at each establishment, together with such dates as have been established as well as the fate of the establishment after dissolution, and the current status of the site.

Formal name or dedication is the formal name of the establishment or the person in whose name the church is dedicated, where known.

Some of the establishments have had alternative names over the course of time; such alternatives in name or spelling have been given.

Alien houses are included, as are smaller establishments such as cells and notable monastic granges (particularly those with resident monks), and also camerae of the military orders of monks (Knights Templars and Knights Hospitaller). The numerous monastic hospitals per se are not included here unless at some time the foundation had, or was purported to have the status or function of an abbey, priory, friary or preceptor/commandery.

The name of the county is given where there is reference to an establishment in another county. Where the county has changed since the foundation's dissolution the modern county is given in parentheses, and in instances where the referenced foundation ceased to exist before the unification of England, the kingdom is given, followed by the modern county in parentheses.

Abbreviations and key

Locations with names in italics indicate probable duplication (misidentification with another location) or non-existent foundations (either erroneous reference or proposed foundation never implemented) or ecclesiastical establishments with a monastic appellation but lacking monastic connection.

Alphabetical listing

Bedfordshire

Return to top of page

Berkshire

Return to top of page

Bristol
(For references and location detail see List of monastic houses in Bristol [ edit]) 

Return to top of page

Buckinghamshire
(For references and location detail see List of monastic houses in Buckinghamshire [ edit])

Return to top of page

Cambridgeshire
(For references and location detail see List of monastic houses in Cambridgeshire [ edit]) 

Return to top of page

Cheshire
(For references and location detail see List of monastic houses in Cheshire [ edit]) 

Return to top of page

Cornwall
(For references and location detail see List of monastic houses in Cornwall[ edit])

Return to top of page

Cumbria
(For references and location detail see List of monastic houses in Cumbria [ edit]) 

Return to top of page

Derbyshire
(For references and location detail see List of monastic houses in Derbyshire[ edit]) 

Return to top of page

Devon
(For references and location detail see List of monastic houses in Devon [ edit])

Return to top of page

Dorset
(For references and location detail see List of monastic houses in Dorset [ edit]) 

Return to top of page

County Durham
(For references and location detail see List of monastic houses in County Durham [ edit]) 

Return to top of page

Essex
(For references and location detail see List of monastic houses in Essex [ edit]) 

Return to top of page

Gloucestershire
(For references and location detail see List of monastic houses in Gloucestershire [ edit]) 

Return to top of page

Greater Manchester
For references or to add or amend any details or images, please refer to the individual article for each monastic house.

Return to top of page

Hampshire

(For references and location detail see List of monastic houses in Hampshire [ edit]) 

Return to top of page

Herefordshire
(For references and location detail see List of monastic houses in Herefordshire [ edit])

Return to top of page

Hertfordshire
(For references and location detail see List of monastic houses in Hertfordshire [ edit]) 

Return to top of page

Isle of Wight

Return to top of page

Kent

Return to top of page

Lancashire
(For references and location detail see List of monastic houses in Lancashire [ edit]) 

Return to top of page

Leicestershire
(For references and location detail see List of monastic houses in Leicestershire [ edit])

Return to top of page

Lincolnshire
(For references and location detail see List of monastic houses in Lincolnshire [ edit]) 

Return to top of page

London
(For references and location detail see List of monastic houses in London [ edit]) 

Return to top of page

Merseyside
(For references and location detail see List of monastic houses in Merseyside [ edit]) 

Return to top of page

Norfolk

Northamptonshire
(For references and location detail see List of monastic houses in Northamptonshire [ edit])

Return to top of page

Northumberland
(For references and location detail see List of monastic houses in Northumberland [ edit])

Return to top of page

Nottinghamshire
(For references and location detail see List of monastic houses in Nottinghamshire [ edit]) 

Return to top of page

Oxfordshire
(For references and location detail see List of monastic houses in Oxfordshire [ edit])

Return to top of page

Rutland
(For references and location detail see List of monastic houses in Rutland [ edit])

Return to top of page

Shropshire
(For references and location detail see List of monastic houses in Shropshire[ edit]) 

Return to top of page

Somerset
(For references and location detail see List of monastic houses in Somerset [ edit]) 

Return to top of page

Staffordshire
(For references and location detail see List of monastic houses in Staffordshire [ edit]) 

Return to top of page

Suffolk
(For references and location detail see List of monastic houses in Suffolk [ edit]) 

Return to top of page

Surrey
(For references and location detail see List of monastic houses in Surrey [ edit]) 

Return to top of page

Sussex

East Sussex
(For references and location detail see List of monastic houses in East Sussex[ edit]) 

Return to top of page

West Sussex
(For references and location detail see List of monastic houses in West Sussex [ edit])

Return to top of page

Tyne and Wear
(For references and location detail see List of monastic houses in Tyne and Wear [ edit])

Return to top of page

Warwickshire
(For references and location detail see List of monastic houses in Warwickshire [ edit])

Return to top of page

West Midlands
(For references and location detail see List of monastic houses in the West Midlands [ edit]) 

Return to top of page

Wiltshire
(For references and location detail see List of monastic houses in Wiltshire [ edit])

Return to top of page

Worcestershire
(For references and location detail see List of monastic houses in Worcestershire [ edit]) 

Return to top of page

East Riding of Yorkshire

Return to top of page

North Yorkshire

Return to top of page

South Yorkshire

South Yorkshire was created in 1974 from part of the former West Riding of Yorkshire.

West Yorkshire

Return to top of page

See also
List of English abbeys, priories and friaries serving as parish churches
List of monasteries dissolved by Henry VIII of England 
List of abbeys and priories
List of monastic houses in Scotland
List of monastic houses in Wales
List of monastic houses on the Isle of Man
List of monastic houses in Ireland
List of monasteries dissolved by Henry VIII of England
List of cathedrals in England and Wales
List of cathedrals in Scotland
List of cathedrals in Ireland
Listed buildings in England
Christian monasticism

Notes

References

Citations

Sources 

 Knowles, David & Hadcock, R. Neville, Medieval Religious Houses of England and Wales, Longman Group Ltd., 1971, 
 New, Anthony, A Guide to the Abbeys of England and Wales, Constable, 1985, 
 Thorold, Henry, Collins Guide to Cathedrals, Abbeys and Priories of England and Wales, Collins, 1986, 
 Thorold, Henry, Collins Guide to the Ruined Abbeys of England, Wales and Scotland,  Collins, 1993, 
 Wright, Geoffrey N., Discovering Abbeys and Priories, Shire Publications Ltd., 2004, 
 Morris, Richard, Cathedrals and Abbeys of England and Wales, J. M. Dent & Sons Ltd., 1979, 
English Cathedrals and Abbeys, Illustrated, Odhams Press Ltd., ISBN none
 James, M. R., Abbeys, The Grammar School, Thornbury, Glos. 1925, 
 Robinson, David, The Cistercian Abbeys of Britain, B. T. Batsford with English Heritage, CADW, Historic Scotland, 2002, 
 Brabbs, Derry, Abbeys and Monasteries, Weidenfeld & Nicolson, 1999, 
 Platt, Colin, The Abbeys and Priories of Medieval England, Barnes & Noble Books, 
 Hogg, Garry, Priories and Abbeys of England, David & Charles (Publishers) Ltd., 1972, 
 Greene, J. Patrick, Norton Priory: the archaeology of a medieval religious house, Cambridge University Press, 1989
 Starkey, H. F., Old Runcorn, Halton Borough Council, 1990
 Map of Monastic Britain, South Sheet, Ordnance Survey, 2nd edition, 1954
 Map of Monastic Britain, North Sheet, Ordnance Survey, 2nd edition, 1955
 William Cobbett, List Of Abbeys, Priories, Nunneries, Hospitals: And Other Religious Foundations In England And Wales And In Ireland, Confiscated, Seized On, Or Alienated, By The Protestant "Reformation" Sovereigns And Parliaments, Thomas Richardson and Son; Dublin and Derby, 1868

External links 
 

England abbeys
 
 
Roman Catholic monasteries in England